Harry Glanville (1880-1959)  nicknamed "Dosser" was an Australian rugby league footballer who played in the 1900s.  He played for North Sydney in the NSWRL competition and was a foundation player of the club.

Background
Glanville played Rugby Union for Northern Suburbs Rugby Club before switching codes in 1907.  Glanville was at the first meeting of the North Sydney Rugby League Football club on 7 February 1908.  Glanville was made the first treasurer of the club.

Playing career
Glanville played in North Sydney's first ever game against South Sydney on 20 April 1908 at Birchgrove Oval.  Glanville kicked the first goals for the club in a 11–7 loss.  Glanville only played 1 season for the club and his final game was a 23–10 defeat against Eastern Suburbs in the 1908 semi final.

Glanville also played in the first ever New South Wales sides in 1907 and 1908.

In his later years, he was a trusted member and employee of the NSWRFL, of which he was a Life Member.

References

1880 births
1959 deaths
Australian rugby league administrators
Australian rugby league players
New South Wales rugby league team players
North Sydney Bears players
Rugby league players from Sydney
Rugby league hookers
Rugby league props
Rugby league centres